Anthony Simcoe (born 7 June 1969) is an Australian actor, known for his portrayal of Steve Kerrigan in the 1997 film The Castle and Ka D'Argo in the science fiction television series Farscape.

The 1.98m (6 ft 6 in) Simcoe is a graduate of the National Institute of Dramatic Arts in Sydney. He holds an MFA in Drama, specializing in actor training.

Simcoe gained international fame when he was cast as Ka D'Argo in Farscape.  He was nominated for a Saturn Award for Best Supporting Actor in a Television Series in 2002 for his work on the show. He has also appeared in several other television series including Chameleon. He also does an appearance in the short film Syntax Error.

Between acting roles he works as a freelance corporate trainer. He also performs in the band "Signal Room" (formerly known as The Giant Killers, and Number 96). He has two sons, Willem Lee and Jackson Ty.

Filmography
{| class="wikitable"
! Title
! Character
! Year
! Format
! Notes
|-
|The Castle || Steve Kerrigan || 1997 || Film ||
|-
|Farscape || Ka D'Argo  || 1999–2003 || TV series  ||
|-
|Marking Time || Scott Seaton || 2003 || Film ||
|-
|Syntax Error || Steve || 2003 || Film ||
|-
|Farscape: The Peacekeeper Wars || Ka D'Argo || 2004 || TV Series ||
|-
|The Alice || Melvyn Knigh || 2005 || TV Series || Appearance Episode 1:19
|-
|Solo || Jim || 2006 || Film ||
|-
|Nim's Island || First Mate || 2008 || Film ||
|-
|Rogue Nation || Major George Johnston || 2009 || TV Series || Appearance Episode 1:1
|-
|Underbelly: A Tale of Two Cities || Danny Chubb || 2009 || TV Series || Appearance 2 Episodes.
|-
|The Inbetweeners 2 || Ken Webster || 2014 || Film ||
|}

External links
 
 
 

1969 births
Australian male film actors
Australian male television actors
Living people
Male actors from Sydney